Andrei Barabaș (born 9 December 1937) is a Romanian middle-distance runner. He competed in the men's 1500 metres at the 1960 Summer Olympics and in the 5,000 and 10,000 meters at the 1964 Summer Olympics.

References

External links
 

1937 births
Living people
Athletes (track and field) at the 1960 Summer Olympics
Athletes (track and field) at the 1964 Summer Olympics
Romanian male middle-distance runners
Romanian male long-distance runners
Olympic athletes of Romania
Place of birth missing (living people)
Universiade medalists in athletics (track and field)
Universiade silver medalists for Romania
Medalists at the 1961 Summer Universiade